Spas is a yoghurt-based soup. It is a traditional dish in Armenia. It can be served hot or cold. Besides yoghurt (or matzoon), the main ingredient is hulled wheat (i.e. with husks removed), or rice. 

An egg or egg yolk is included, to prevent the yoghurt from curdling.

Sometimes a green leaf vegetable such as spinach is added, or herbs (usually coriander or mint) are used as a garnish, and when hot it can be served with meatballs included.

References 

Armenian soups
Yogurt-based dishes